Bhota is a village in Gujrat District in Punjab Province, Pakistan. This village came in to being in start of 18th century. The majority of population's caste is Muslim Rajput Janjua and Rajput Bhatti.

Its Post Code is 50960.

References 

Villages in Gujrat District